Melaleuca orbicularis is a plant in the myrtle family, Myrtaceae and is endemic to the south-west of Western Australia. It is similar to Melaleuca cordata with its pinkish "pom-pom" heads of flowers but its leaves are smaller, almost circular compared to the heart shaped leaves of the other species.

Description

The flowers are a shade of pink to purple and are arranged in heads on the ends of branches which continue to grow after flowering and sometimes also in the upper leaf axils. The outer surface of the floral cup (the hypanthium) is hairy and there are five bundles of stamens around the flower, each with 5 to 12 stamens.

Taxonomy and naming
Melaleuca orbicularis was first formally described in 1999 by Lyndley Craven in Australian Systematic Botany from a specimen collected near Bindi Bindi. The specific epithet (orbicularis) is a Latin word meaning "circular" referring to the circular leaves.

Distribution and habitat
Melaleuca orbicularis occurs in and between the Coorong, Wongan Hills and Cowcowing districts in the Avon Wheatbelt, Geraldton Sandplains, Jarrah Forest and Warren biogeographic regions. It grows in a range of vegetation associations in sand over sandstone and laterite.

Conservation
Melaleuca orbicularis is listed as "not threatened" by the Government of Western Australia Department of Parks and Wildlife.

References

orbicularis
Plants described in 1999
Endemic flora of Western Australia
Taxa named by Lyndley Craven